Raoul Palmgren (12 January 1912, Karis — 10 March 1995, Tampere) was a Finnish writer and recipient of the Eino Leino Prize in 1972. He was also a literature scholar and a professor at University of Oulu in 1968–1976.

References

1912 births
1995 deaths
People from Raseborg
People from Uusimaa Province (Grand Duchy of Finland)
Finnish People's Democratic League politicians
Writers from Uusimaa
Finnish writers
Recipients of the Eino Leino Prize
Finnish literary critics
Finnish military personnel of World War II
Prisoners and detainees of Finland
Academic staff of the University of Oulu